Prochy may refer to:

Prochy, Grodzisk Wielkopolski County in Greater Poland Voivodeship (west-central Poland)
Prochy, Złotów County in Greater Poland Voivodeship (west-central Poland)
Prochy, Wąbrzeźno County in Kuyavian-Pomeranian Voivodeship (north-central Poland)